is a Japanese footballer who plays for FC Imabari, on loan from Cerezo Osaka.

Career
Shu Mogi joined J1 League club Cerezo Osaka in 2017.

Career statistics
Updated to 22 February 2018

References

External links
Profile at Cerezo Osaka

1999 births
Living people
Association football people from Kanagawa Prefecture
Japanese footballers
Association football goalkeepers
Cerezo Osaka players
FC Machida Zelvia players
Mito HollyHock players
J1 League players
J2 League players
J3 League players
Japan under-20 international footballers